Three Wives is a 2001 film directed by Marco Risi. Iaia Forte was nominated for the 2002 Silver Ribbons for the best supporting actress.

Plot
On New Year's Eve three women meet at the police station: Beatrice, Bianca and Billy. Their husbands have disappeared having stolen 9 billion lire from the bank of which they are respectively director, cashier and security guard. A year later, the three women are brought to Buenos Aires, Argentina.

Their husbands are owners of luxury homes, herds and even a restaurant in Patagonia. Beatrice finds out that Saverio had always cheated on her with his ex-girlfriend and that they lived together in Buenos Aires. Bianca discovers that Antonio went to prostitutes and had a girlfriend actress of telenovelas and finally Billy discovers that her husband Gino has always been homosexual.

They are followed by Amedeo, a clumsy policeman with an overbearing fiancee, who befriends the women under the disguise of a nature photographer. Amedeo falls in love with Billy and spends one night with her, while Bianca and Beatrice have respectively a one-night stand as week with a tango teacher and a French tourist. And when it seems that they are about to find their husbands, they discover that their boat had hit the Perito Moreno Glacier killing them, In fact, being bankrupt they staged their death and assumed false identities and now ask the wives to meet them in Ushuaia, where they ended up working in a bank.

The three women, now aware of how much better their life could be without them, abandon them and start a new life: Billy marries Amedeo and they have a son while Beatrice and Bianca move to Buenos Aires and open a restaurant called  "Le Tre Mogli" ("The Three Wives") and lead a carefree and independent life. But on New Year's Eve, the last minute of the film, their husbands enter the restaurant ...

Production
The restaurant scene was filmed over two days in San Babila, a classic Italian restaurant in Buenos Aires, .

External links
Three wives on the Internet Movie Database, IMDb.com. Modifica su Wikidata
Three wives, on the BFI Film & TV Database, British Film Institute .

External links

Films directed by Marco Risi
Italian comedy-drama films
2001 films
2000s Italian-language films
2000s Italian films